The UFO Files: The Inside Story of Real-Life Sightings, published by The National Archives in 2009, is an official history of British UFO reports. 
The author, David Clarke, is a senior lecturer in journalism at Sheffield Hallam University.

The book forms part of an international programme of declassification of UFO documents. Clarke has worked at The National Archives as a consultant on this subject since 2008.

References

External links
Newly released UFO files from the UK government at The National Archives, including a podcast and other material by the author. Retrieved 2011-03-30.

2009 non-fiction books
British non-fiction books
Books about the United Kingdom
UFO-related literature